Cogwheel may refer to:

 Cogwheel, a gear with inserted, replaceable, teeth - designed to transmit torque to another gear or toothed component.
 Cogwheel (neurology), a sign of Hypokinesia